How Wood is a residential village, south of Park Street village between the towns of Watford and St Albans in St Stephen civil parish, Hertfordshire, England.

Although the area was once part of Park Street, development took place in most of the agricultural fields around Park Street Lane. Park Street joined the City Council rather than St Stephen civil parish.  How Wood has grown to a sizeable residential area: its population in 2001 was 3,542.  The area has the physical divide from Park Street of a railway line bridge adjoining two fields and a wood leading down to increasingly riverside woodland in Park Street, which sits on the river Ver in the northwest.

Amenities
In How Wood there is a row of shops on How Wood, including a Co-op and an off-licence, a stationery shop and computer repair centre called BluelightOfiice.  Park Street Lane leads under the railway line and then is immediately in the edge of the village centre of Park Street; in the centre is a Barbers and two pubs

There are two schools, one outlying and one on the main street which has three listed buildings; the main street is a by-road to St Albans as it is from Bricket Wood only.  The listed buildings are at Grade II and are Park Cottage, The Homestead and Orchard Cottage.  Burstone Manor Farm is a pretty farm with mainly plant nurseries and some fisheries between the village and Chiswell Green - it is at the higher Grade II* and is a much older timber frame building, some of it 12th century, the remainder of it 15th and 17th century with new casements and with a moat., between the housing estates and Burstone Manor Farm are the smaller remains of How Wood and the larger Birch Wood.

Park Street and St Albans offer nearby eateries and bars, several adjoining the rather pure river Ver which is opposite Park Street Village and has the closest watercress beds to London.

Transport
The village is served by How Wood railway station on the Abbey Line, linking it with St Albans Abbey and Watford Junction.

How Wood has its own primary school, How Wood Primary School and Nursery.

Site of Special Scientific Interest
Moor Mill Quarry, West, a geological Site of Special Scientific Interest, is located on the other side of the railway line.

Nearest Settlements

References

Villages in Hertfordshire
City of St Albans